North Bay Trappers may refer to:
North Bay Trappers (1962–1982), defunct Canadian junior ice hockey team
North Bay Trappers (1988–), Canadian junior ice hockey team in the Northern Ontario Junior Hockey League
North Bay Trappers (EPHL), defunct Canadian ice hockey team in the Eastern Professional Hockey League